An octadecatetraenoic acid is a chemical compound with formula , a polyunsaturated fatty acid with whose molecule has an 18-carbon unbranched backbone with four double bonds.

The name refers has different structural and conformational isomers, that differ in the position of the double bonds and on whether they are in cis ('Z') or trans ('E') conformation.  Some isomers have considerable biological, pharmaceutical, or industrial importance, such as:

 α-Parinaric acid (9Z,11E,13E,15Z), found in the seeds of the makita tree (Parinari laurina)
 Stearidonic acid (6Z,9Z,12Z,15Z), an essential fatty acid
  (5Z,9Z,12Z,15Z), found in Larix decidua

References 

Fatty acids
Alkenoic acids